The 1970 Star World Championships were held in Marstrand, Sweden in 1970.

Results

References

Star World Championships
1970 in sailing
Sailing competitions in Sweden
Sport in Västra Götaland County